The 126th Infantry Regiment is a regiment first constituted during the French Revolution.

Creation and different nominations 
 August 1793 in France : appeared officially the number 126 in the infantry history of the French Military, under the designation of 126th battle demi-brigade within the cadre of the reorganization of the armies of the revolution.
 1793 - 1796 : creation of the 126th battle demi-brigade, from the 2nd battalion of the 62nd Infantry Regiment, merged from two armies under the revolution, the 2nd Volunteer Battalion of Ain and the 3rd Volunteer Battalion of Nièvre.
 1796 in France : the unit was incorporated into the 99th Infantry Regiment.
 1810 - 1813 : creation of the 126th Line Infantry Regiment from the 5th Infantry Regiment and the 1st battalion of the 8th Infantry Regiment of the Kingdom of Holland, during the annexation of the latter.
 1813 in France: incorporation of the remainder of the regiment into the 123rd Infantry Regiment.
 1870 - 1871 : formed on November 1, 1870 with the 26th Marching Regiment organized on August 27 by means of the 4th battalion of the 66th Infantry Regiment,(), the 89th Infantry Regiment, and the 98th Infantry Regiment. Merged on March 27, 1871 in France with the 26th Infantry Regiment.
 May 16, 1871 in France : creation of the 126 Line Infantry Regiment formed with the 19th Provsionary Infantry Regiment.
 April 4, 1872 : a decree of the President of the Republic constituted officially the regiment which was designated as 126th Infantry Regiment, composed of four battalions of four companies.
 August 1914 in France: gave formation to the 326th Infantry Regiment.
 August 5, 1940 : dissolution.
 1944 - 1946 : 126th Infantry Regiment. Reconstituted officially on October 15, 1944 in France, dissolved April 1, 1946 in France.
 April 1, 1946 in France: creation of the 126th Infantry Battalion.
 1946 : dissolution.
 February 1, 1946 in France : creation of the 126th Infantry Regiment.

History

Wars of the Revolution and Empire 
 1795: Quiberon
 1812: the regiment took part in the campaign of Russia:
 Smoliany, Borisow
 November 26–29, 1812: Battle of Berezina where the regiment as a whole covered the unfolding of the Grande Armée.

Second Empire 
 1870 - 1871: Siege of Paris

1870 to 1914 
1874: garrison at Lyon.
 1881 to 1896: campaigns of North African and Madagascar.
 1907, the regiment left Toulouse and arrived in garrison at Brive-la-Gaillarde.

World War I 
Garrison: Brive-la-Gaillarde, 48th Infantry Brigade, 12th Army Corps.
Assigned to the 24th Infantry Division from August 1914 to November 1918.

 1914:
 Unfolding of the IIIrd Army and IVth Army: Saint-Médard, Florenville (August 22–23), Carignan
 First Battle of the Marne, September 5 to 13: Châtel-Raould, Courdemanges
 1915 :
Meuse and Argonne : Regniéville, Réménauville, Wooden Forest d'Ailly

 1916 :
 Battle of Verdun - Marre-Charny.
 1917 :
 Champagne : Maison-de-Champagne (March 8–12), Auberive (April 17).
 1918 :
 Italian front : Austrian offensive of June 15, Piave offensive

Interwar period 
The 126e RI was in garrison at Brive-la-Gaillarde in January 1939, and recalled to apply the "barrage plan" in the Pyrénées-Orientales.

World War II 
The regiment illustrated capability in June 1940 to halt offensives, while record marching 350 km in two weeks.

The regiment was reconstituted in 1944 from marquis of Corrèze and Périgord and participated in the liberation of Alsace, then entered the Black Forest. In January 1945, the 126th Infantry Regiment was integrated into the First Army, which was first at the disposition of the 2nd Brigade of the 1st Free French Division 1re DFL, where the 126th reinforced the 2nd Brigade during the period of the defensive mounted on Strasbourg, and the surveillance of left wing of the Rhin. Then, with the 2nd Moroccan Infantry Division 2e DIM, and participating with the 9th Colonial Infantry Division 9e DIC to campaign battles, combat of Karlsruhe, Ruppur, Rastadt with the 23e RIC and 6e RIC.

1945 to present 
 In Algeria from 1947 to 1948, the regiment was designated as a center of instruction for that theatre.
 Assigned to the 15th Infantry Division; materials forming in the 1980s were constituted by a number of U.S. American equipment from World War II, including machine pistol types used in Indochina and Algeria.
 Professionalized in 1998, in the respective garrison, the regiment was attached to the 3rd Light Armoured Brigade.
 The regiment was part of the United Nations Interim Force in Lebanon (UNIFIL) in Lebanon in 1984/1985 then also in 1992 with the 5th Chasseur Regiment of Périgueux.
 Conducted operations in Bosnia and Herzegovina after 1992.
 Conducted operations in Lebanon in 2001.
 Conducted operations in Kosovo in 2011 and 2004.
 Conducted operations in Afghanistan in 2002, 2006, 2008, 2010 at the corps of International Security Assistance Force (ISAF). On February 29, 2008 in Afghanistan: training instruction of the Afghan National Army (ANA) with the 126e RI.
 Conducted operations in the Ivory Coast in 2001, 2003, 2004, 2005 and in 2008 at the corps of Opération Licorne.
 Conducted operations in the Central African Republic in 2006, 2011, 2012, 2014.
 Conducted the mandate PAMIR in Surobi, Afghanistan from July to December 2010 under designation (GTIA).
 Permanence in France at the corps of the Vigipirate.

Traditions

Insignia of the 126e RI 

White Buffalo since 1937, on the background of a blue Cross of Lorraine since 1944.

Lieutenant-colonel Godefroy, regimental commander of the 126e RI endowed the regiment with an insignia featuring the ruins of Oradour, to evoke the 134th Infantry Regiment which was integrated to the 126e RI in October 1945.

The actual insignia of the regiment was endowed by colonel Mestelan, regimental commander from 1979 to 1981.

Regimental Colors

Decorations 
The regimental colors of the 126e RI are decorated with:

 Croix de guerre 1914-1918 with :
 2 bronz palms ( 2 citations at the orders of the armed forces)
 Croix de la Valeur militaire with:
 1 bronz palm (November 23, 2011)
 1 palm (June 26, 2013)

Fourragere:
 Fourragere with colors of the croix de guerre 1914-1918 and colors of the croix de la Valeur militaire.

Honours

Battle Honours 
 Bérézina 1812
 Artois 1915
 Auberive 1917
 Italie 1918

Regimental Commanders

References

External links 
  Le 126e régiment d'infanterie sur le site internet www.defense.gouv.fr du Ministère de la Défense

Infantry regiments of France
Regiments of France in the French Revolutionary Wars